Jordan William Palmer (born May 30, 1984) is a former American football quarterback and the current Director of Quarterback Development for the XFL. He was drafted by the Washington Redskins in the sixth round of the 2007 NFL Draft. He played college football at UTEP.

Palmer was also a member of the Arizona Rattlers, Jacksonville Jaguars, Cincinnati Bengals, Sacramento Mountain Lions, Chicago Bears, Buffalo Bills, and Tennessee Titans. He is the younger brother of former NFL quarterback Carson Palmer.

College career
During his freshman year at UTEP, Palmer threw seven touchdowns and 13 interceptions while completing 49.5% of his passes for 1,168 yards.  During his sophomore year he threw for 26 touchdowns and 18 interceptions while completing 58.2% of his passes for 2,618 yards.  In his junior year in 2005, he led UTEP to the 2005 GMAC Bowl against Toledo.  He threw for a career-high 29 touchdowns and 19 interceptions while completing 59.4% of his passes for 3,503 yards.  In his senior season, Palmer threw for 26 touchdowns and 14 interceptions.  He completed 65.7% of his passes while his team went 5–7 and did not qualify for post-season play.

Statistics

Professional career

Washington Redskins
The Washington Redskins drafted Palmer in the sixth round of the 2007 NFL Draft with the 205th pick overall.

On August 4, 2007, the Baltimore Ravens hosted the Redskins in a pre-season game in Baltimore. Their only score of the scrimmage was on a 24-yard touchdown pass from Palmer to rookie wide receiver Burl Toler.

On September 2, 2007, the Redskins waived Palmer during final cuts.

Arizona Rattlers
On November 6, 2007, Palmer signed with the Arizona Rattlers of the Arena Football League for the 2008 season.

Cincinnati Bengals

On January 30, 2008, Palmer signed a two-year contract with the Cincinnati Bengals. The Palmer brothers became the first brothers in NFL history to hold a quarterback position on the same team at the same time; brothers Koy and Ty Detmer were both on the Philadelphia Eagles roster at the same time, but Ty was on injured reserve.

After the release of back-up quarterback J. T. O'Sullivan, Palmer was promoted to the backup quarterback of the Bengals behind his older brother Carson for the 2010 season.

On November 21, 2010, the Palmer brothers became the first pair in NFL history to play quarterback in the same game for the same team, in a loss to the Buffalo Bills.

The Bengals released Palmer on August 27, 2011.

Jacksonville Jaguars
Palmer signed with the Jacksonville Jaguars on May 7, 2012 and spent the preseason with the team until being released on August 31.

He was re-signed on November 21, 2012 after starting quarterback Blaine Gabbert was placed on injured reserve. He was later released again.

Chicago Bears
Palmer signed with the Chicago Bears on August 16, 2013 after third-string QB Matt Blanchard broke his hand. Palmer had previously worked out with the Bears during the 2013 offseason. He was released on August 30, 2013. After the Bears lost Jay Cutler to an injury in week 7 against the Washington Redskins on October 20, the Bears reported they would bring back Palmer to back up Josh McCown. Palmer was officially signed on October 28. Two days before the start of the 2014 free agency period, Palmer re-signed with the Bears on a one-year deal. The Bears released Palmer on August 24, 2014.

Buffalo Bills
On August 25, 2014, Palmer signed with the Buffalo Bills, but was released on August 29.

Tennessee Titans
On December 15, 2014, Palmer signed with the Tennessee Titans for the remainder of the 2014 season after Jake Locker was placed on IR. Palmer made just over $67,000 for his month with the Titans.

NFL career statistics

Coaching career
Palmer worked as a quarterbacks coach at EXOS, an NFL Draft training center in Carlsbad, California, in early 2014.

As the founder of QB Summit, an in-person Orange County, California, quarterback consulting program and online digital platform, Palmer tutored players including Patrick Mahomes, Deshaun Watson, Josh Allen, Sam Darnold, Joe Burrow, Kyle Allen, and Bo Nix, among others.

XFL 
In August 2022, Palmer was named Director of Quarterback Development for the XFL.

Personal life
He is the younger brother of former NFL quarterback Carson Palmer, who was the first overall pick in the 2003 NFL Draft by the Cincinnati Bengals. The two spent three seasons together as teammates with the Bengals, with him being Carson's backup.

See also
 List of Arena Football League and National Football League players
 List of Division I FBS passing yardage leaders

References

External links

 Chicago Bears bio
 Cincinnati Bengals bio

1984 births
Living people
American football quarterbacks
Arizona Rattlers players
Cincinnati Bengals players
Players of American football from California
UTEP Miners football players
Chicago Bears players
Buffalo Bills players
Washington Redskins players
Sacramento Mountain Lions players
Jacksonville Jaguars players
Tennessee Titans players
Sportspeople from Mission Viejo, California
People from Westlake Village, California
Sportspeople from Ventura County, California